Vitali Sergeyevich Belichenko (born 25 August 1982) is a former Russian professional football player.

Club career
He played 3 seasons in the Russian Football National League for FC Chita and FC Dynamo Barnaul.

References

External links
 

1982 births
Living people
Russian footballers
Association football defenders
FC Dynamo Barnaul players
FC Chita players